Eupodes is a genus of mites. It includes the species Eupodes minutus.

References

Trombidiformes genera